The Dolley Madison silver dollar is a commemorative silver dollar issued by the United States Mint in 1999. The obverse depicts Dolley Madison, and the reverse shows the Madison family house Montpelier. Some proceeds benefited the National Trust for Historic Preservation.  The coin was authorized by Public Law 104-329.

Sales 
500,000 Dolley Madison dollars were authorized by Public Law 104-329.  The Philadelphia Mint struck 158,247 proof and 22,948 uncirculated Dolley Madison dollars.

See also

 List of United States commemorative coins and medals (1990s)
 United States commemorative coins
 United States Commemorative Coin Act of 1996

References

1999 establishments in the United States
Modern United States commemorative coins